Lukemi is a commune in the city of Kikwit, the capital of Kwilu province, in the Democratic Republic of Congo.

References 

 Kikwit
Communes of the Democratic Republic of the Congo